New Orleans is featured in a number of works of fiction. This article in an ongoing effort to list the books, movies, television shows, and comics that are set or filmed, in whole or part, in New Orleans.

Books
Authors who have repeatedly or frequently used New Orleans as a setting for their fiction include James Lee Burke, Poppy Z. Brite, Truman Capote, Nancy A. Collins, Barbara Hambly, Lafcadio Hearn, Frances Parkinson Keyes, Caitlín R. Kiernan, Anne Rice, James Sallis, Julie Smith, and Alexandrea Weis. The most significant novel featuring the city may be the Pulitzer Prize-winning A Confederacy of Dunces by John Kennedy Toole (1980). Works that feature the city include:

  Accordion Crimes (1996) by E. Annie Proulx (setting for exposition and rising action)
  Albert, Himself by Jeff W. Bens
 The Anti-Vampire Tale (2010) by Lewis Aleman
 The Awakening (1899) by Kate Chopin
 The Beautiful (2019) by Renée Ahdieh
 Blue Moon Over New Orleans by Anna Mayhall Munding (post WWII mystery novel set in New Orleans)
 Blues and Trouble: Twelve Stories by Tom Piazza (the first short story, "Brownsville", is set in New Orleans)
 Chasing the Devil's Tail (2001) and sequels by David Fulmer (jazz mysteries featuring Valentin St. Cyr)
 City of Refuge by Tom Piazza
Clarimonde by Napier Bartlett (features a Creole tale and a description of New Orleans during the American Civil War)
The Client (1993) and The Pelican Brief (1992) by John Grisham
 The Coffee Shop Chronicles of New Orleans - Part 1 (2010) by David Lummis
 Cold Streak (2008) by Lewis Aleman
 The Condor Passes (1971) and The House on Coliseum Street (1961) by Shirley Ann Grau
 A Confederacy of Dunces (1980) by John Kennedy Toole
 Crescent City (1984) by Belva Plain
Crooked Man (1994) and nine subsequent Tubby Dubonnet Mysteries by Tony Dunbar
The Crystal City (2003) by Orson Scott Card (features an alternate-history version of New Orleans in which it is controlled by the Spanish and called 'Nueva Barcelona' or 'Barcy')
 A Density of Souls (2000) by Christopher Rice
 Dinner at Antoine's (1948), Crescent Carnival (1942), and others by Frances Parkinson Keyes
 Exquisite Corpse by Poppy Z. Brite
 Faces in Time by Lewis Aleman (2009)
 Fantasy Lover (2006) and sequels, comprising The Dark-Hunter Series by Sherrilyn Kenyon
 Fat White Vampire Blues (2003) and sequel by Andrew Fox
 The Feast of All Saints (1979) by Anne Rice
 Fleur deKey a debut French Quarter mystery by vickie pettee
 Flying Solo: An Unconventional Aviatrix Navigates Turbulence in Life by Jeannette Vaughan
 The three Frankenstein books by Dean Koontz, Kevin J. Anderson, and Ed Gorman [Prodigal Son (2005), City of Night (2005), and Lost Souls (2010)]
 A Free Man of Color (1997) and sequels (The Benjamin January Mysteries) by Barbara Hambly
 Gone with the Wind (1936) by Margaret Mitchell (location of Rhett and Scarlett's honeymoon)
 The Grandissimes (1880) by George Washington Cable
 A Hall of Mirrors (1967) by Robert Stone
 Hoodoo Money by Sharon Cupp Pennington
 Interview with the Vampire (1976) and sequels, collectively known as The Vampire Chronicles, by Anne Rice
 The epic fiction Jitterbug Perfume (1984) by Tom Robbins uses modern day New Orleans as one of four major settings along with 8th-century Bohemia, modern day Seattle, and modern day Paris
Junkie (1953) by William S. Burroughs
 Lafitte the Pirate by Lyle Saxon, the basis for the 1938 film The Buccaneer and the 1958 remake of the same name
 Life on the Mississippi (1883) by Mark Twain (Chapter XLI: "The Metropolis of the South")
 The Liquor series (2004) by Poppy Z. Brite
 Lives of the Mayfair Witches (1990-1994) by Anne Rice
 "Madam: A Novel of New Orleans" (2014) by Cari Lynn and Kellie Martin (based on true events of Storyville and Madam Josie Arlington)
 Manon Lescaut (1731) by Antoine François Prévost (features the early French colony at New Orleans at one point in the book)
 The Map of Moments (2009) by Christopher Golden and Tim Lebbon
 Midnight Bayou (2001) and Honest Illusions (1992) by Nora Roberts
 Misisipi (2012) by Michael Reilly, climaxing during the events of Hurricane Katrina
 Monsieur Motte (1888) by Grace King
 Mosquitos (1927) and Pylon (1935) by William Faulkner (the latter novel takes place in "New Valois," a thinly disguised New Orleans)
 Moth (1993) and sequels (Lew Griffin mysteries) by James Sallis
 The Moviegoer (1961) by Walker Percy (winner of the 1962 National Book Award)
 Mules and Men (1935) by Zora Neale Hurston
 To My Senses, Recovery, Sacrifice, The Ghosts of Rue Dumaine, Dark Perception, Taming Me, Cover to Covers, Dark Attraction, The Satyr's Curse, Blackwell by Alexandrea Weis
 Neon Rain (1987) and sequels (Dave Robicheaux mysteries) by James Lee Burke
 New Orleans, Mon Amour (2006) by Andrei Codrescu (collection of essays and short stories)
 New Orleans Mourning (1990) and sequels (Skip Langdon mysteries) by Julie Smith
 New Orleans Noir (2007) edited by Julie Smith (short stories by various authors)
 Off Magazine Street (2005) by Ronald Everett Capps, the basis for the 2004 film A Love Song for Bobby Long
 One More Last Dance (2017) by Jerry Antil
 Outside Child (2007) by Alice Wilson-Fried (Silver Medalist in the 2008 IPPY Awards)
 Paul Marchand, F.M.C. (1921) by Charles Chesnutt
 A Quiet Vendetta (2005) by R. J. Ellory
 Side Effects: A New Orleans Love Story by Patty Friedmann
 Tranquility Denied (2007) by novelist A. C. Frieden
 Twelfth Night by Michael Llewellyn
 Treasure Mountain (1972) by Louis Dearborn L'Amour
 Unmasked by Jody Gerbig
 Vampires of the French Quarter (2019) by Gilbert DuBose
Violets and Other Tales (1895) and The Goodness of Saint Rocque and Other Stories (1899) by Alice Dunbar-Nelson
 Voodoo Dreams and  Voodoo Season (1993) by Jewell Parker Rhodes
 A Walk on the Wild Side (1956) by Nelson Algren, the basis for the 1962 film Walk on the Wild Side
 John Raven Beau by O'Neil De Noux named Best Police Book of 2011 by police-writers.com.
 Zeitoun (2009) by Dave Eggers

Comic books and graphic novels 
 In the Marvel Comics fictional universe, New Orleans is the home city for the X-Man Gambit, as well as the guilds of Thieves and Assassins; as well as the leader of the latter guild, Bella Donna Boudreaux.
 The nonfiction webcomic A.D.: New Orleans After the Deluge is about six real-life residents of New Orleans and their experiences before, during, and after Hurricane Katrina.
 In the DC Comics fictional universe, New Orleans has been given a neighboring city, St. Roch, Louisiana, serving as an occasional home to the original Hawkman and Hawkgirl.
 The Marvel Comics heroine Monica Rambeau, known as Captain Marvel II and Photon, is from New Orleans.
 In the Marvel Max comic Hellstorm—Son of Satan, post-Katrina New Orleans is the setting.

Film
New Orleans has served as the backdrop for a number of films with iconic turns in films such as Gone With the Wind (1939), A Streetcar Named Desire (1951), Little New Orleans Girl (1956), The Cincinnati Kid (1965), Live and Let Die (1973), Little New Orleans Girl (1978), Interview with the Vampire (1994), Little New Orleans Girl (2004), The Curious Case of Benjamin Button (2008), and The Princess and the Frog (2009). Films set in the city include:

 12 Rounds (2009)
 Abbott and Costello Go to Mars (1953)
 Albino Alligator (1997)
 All Dogs Go to Heaven (1989)
 Angel Heart (1987)
 Arachnoquake (2012)
 Bad Lieutenant: Port of Call New Orleans (2009)
 Belle of the Nineties (1934)
 The Big Easy (1987)
 Blade (2024)
 Blaze (1989)
 Blue Bayou (2021)
 The Buccaneer (1938) and The Buccaneer (1958)
 Candyman 2: Farewell to the Flesh (1995)
 Captain Marvel (2019)
 Cat People (1982)
 The Cincinnati Kid (1965) (#1 film in U.S.)
 Città violenta (1970)
 The Client (1994)
 The Curious Case of Benjamin Button (2008)
 Déjà Vu (2006)
 Double Jeopardy (1999)
 Down by Law (1986)
 Dracula 2000 (2000)
 The Drowning Pool (1975)
 Easy Rider (1969) (box office #1 film in the U.S.)
 The Family That Preys (2008)
 Father Hood (1993)
 The Flame of New Orleans (1941)
 Gone With the Wind (1939) (#1 film in U.S.)
 Hard Target (1993)
 Hard Times (1975)
 Hatchet (2006)
 Hatchet II (2010)
 The Haunted Mansion (2003)
 Hell Baby (2013)
 Hurricane Season (2010)
 If God Is Willing and Da Creek Don't Rise (2010)
 Interview with the Vampire (1994) (#1 film in U.S.)
 J. D.'s Revenge (1976)
 Jezebel (1938)
 JFK (1991)
 Johnny Handsome (1989)
 Judas Kiss (1998)
 Killing Them Softly (2012)
 King Creole (1958)
 Lady from Louisiana (1941)
 Last Holiday (2006)
 Let's Do It Again (1975)
 The Librarian: Curse of the Judas Chalice (2008)
Little New Orleans Girl (1956, 1978, 2004)
 Live and Let Die (1973) (#1 film in U.S.)
 A Love Song for Bobby Long (2004)
 A Murder of Crows (1999)
 New Orleans (1947)
 No Mercy (1986)
 Number One (1969)
 Obsession (1976)
 Panic in the Streets (1950)
 The Pelican Brief (1993) (#1 film in U.S.)
 Point Of No Return (1993)
 Pretty Baby (1978)
 The Princess and the Frog (2009, Disney) (#1 film in U.S.)
 Project Power (2020)
 RED (2010) 
 Ruby Bridges (1998)
 Runaway Jury (2003)
 Scooby-Doo on Zombie Island (1998)
 The Skeleton Key (2005)
 Sonny (2002)
 Storyville (1992)
 A Streetcar Named Desire (1951, 1984, 1995)
 Streets of Blood (2009)
 Tightrope (1984)
 The Toast of New Orleans (1950)
 Toys in the Attic (1963)
 Tune In Tomorrow (1990)
 Undercover Blues (1993)
 Vendetta (1999)
 Walk on the Wild Side (1963)
 When the Levees Broke: A Requiem in Four Acts (2006)
 Wild at Heart (1990)
 WUSA (1970)
 X-Men Origins: Wolverine (2009) (#1 film in U.S.)
 Zandalee (1991)

Plays and operas
New Orleans has been the setting of many works of theatre, most prominently perhaps are some of the plays of Tennessee Williams. Plays and operas set in the city include:
 A Streetcar Named Desire by Tennessee Williams (1947 play, winner of the 1948 Pulitzer Prize for drama)
Little New Orleans Girl by Tennessee Williams (1954 play, winner of the 1955 Pulitzer Prize for drama, comedy and musical)
 Vieux Carre (1977) by Tennessee Williams
 A Streetcar Named Desire, 1995 opera
 Manon Lescaut (1893), opera by Giacomo Puccini based on the Antoine François Prévost (Abbé Prévost) novel.  The last scene (Act IV) is set in New Orleans, then a French colony, where Manon dies in Des Grieux's arms.

Television
New Orleans has been the regular setting of several TV shows, the most prominent being David Simon's HBO series Treme, and has been featured in several others. TV shows include:

The Big Easy 
USA network TV series (1996–97) adapted from the film of the same name.

Frank's Place 
A CBS comedy-drama series that chronicled the life of Frank Parrish (Tim Reid), a well-to-do professor at Brown University, who inherits a New Orleans restaurant, Chez Louisiane.  The series received the Television Critics Association award for outstanding comedy series in 1987, as well as an Emmy for best writing in a comedy series. However, it only lasted for one season (1987–88).  Although set in New Orleans, the series was actually filmed in Los Angeles.

K-Ville 
A short-lived crime series that debuted in 2007, which focused on the New Orleans police department in the aftermath of Hurricane Katrina. The series also centers around two New Orleans police detectives, Anthony Anderson as Marlin Boulet and Cole Hauser as Trevor Cobb, who were partners that "have conflicting ideas about how to handle the city's problems."

Longstreet 
A crime drama series about a blind insurance investigator that was broadcast on the ABC in the 1971-1972 season. The series was set in New Orleans, but actually filmed in Los Angeles.

Orleans 
This short-lived 1997 CBS series starring Larry Hagman was set in and partially filmed in New Orleans.

Treme 
An American drama developed by David Simon that premiered in April 2010, Treme centers around residents of New Orleans, including musicians, chefs, Mardi Gras Indians, and ordinary New Orleanians trying to rebuild their lives, their homes and their unique culture in the aftermath of Hurricane Katrina. The series also explores New Orleans culture including and beyond the music scene to encompass political corruption, the public housing controversy, the criminal-justice system, clashes between police and Mardi Gras Indians, and the struggle to regain the tourism industry after the storm. The show is filmed on location in New Orleans and features both local actors in several roles in addition to a number of notable New Orleanians who appear as themselves.

NCIS: New Orleans
CBS series (2014–2021) starring Scott Bakula and Lucas Black.

Cloak and Dagger
Freedom series (2018-2019) starring Olivia Holt as Dagger and Aubrey Joseph as Cloak. New Orleans serves as the main setting of the series and is also filmed and produced there.

Other television references 
Many television series have referenced the city:
 An episode of Jem and the Holograms was set in New Orleans.
 Season 9 (2000) of The Real World was set in New Orleans. * Season 24 (2010) of The Real World was also set in New Orleans.
 In a 2001 episode of Seven Days, Parker goes to New Orleans to prove that his friend, who is scheduled to be executed, is innocent.
 In a 2003 episode of The Drew Carey Show, Drew and his buddies set off on a road trip to New Orleans to find a girl he met after placing an ad on a beer bottle.
 In a 2004 episode of Las Vegas called "New Orleans", Danny, Ed and Sam head to New Orleans in search of a big gambler who owes the casino money.
 In a 2005 episode of Law and Order: Special Victims Unit, the detectives pursue a child molester who kidnapped three young sisters from New Orleans after their parents were killed in the aftermath of Hurricane Katrina.
 In a 2005 episode of Bones, Dr. Temperance Brennen and Agent Seeley Booth head to New Orleans to help identify bodies found after Hurricane Katrina. The plot revolves heavily around the underground voodoo practices in the city.
 In a 2006 episode of House called "Who's Your Daddy?". House deals with patient who is the daughter of an old college roommate and is having hallucinations after having survived an ordeal resulting from Hurricane Katrina.
 In a 2007 episode of Boston Legal, Denny Crane and Alan Shore visit New Orleans to defend a doctor accused of euthanizing patients.
 Monica Dawson a character on the NBC television series Heroes lives in New Orleans. Her parents were killed in Hurricane Katrina.
 The X-Files character Monica Reyes worked for the FBI in New Orleans before becoming John Doggett's partner.
 New Orleans is the setting of The Simpsons spin-off, Chief Wiggum P.I., starring Chief Wiggum, as well as the setting for Oh! Streetcar!, a musical version of A Streetcar Named Desire featured on another episode of the show.
 Star Trek: Deep Space Nine character Benjamin Sisko is a native of New Orleans.  His father Joseph Sisko is also a native of New Orleans, and has a restaurant near Jackson Square in the 2370s.  The family restaurant is seen in the episodes "Homefront", "Paradise Lost", "Tears of the Prophets", "Image in the Sand" and Shadows and Symbols". Other episodes to be set in New Orleans include "The Visitor".  New Orleans is also mentioned in the episodes "Equilibrium", "Explorers", "Family Business" and "What You Leave Behind". The New Orleans class starship is named for the city.
  The Curb Your Enthusiasm character Leon Black was a native resident of New Orleans before moving in with Larry David after Katrina.
 In Season 4 Episode 8 of The Vampire Diaries, Stefan and Damon visit New Orleans. Again in Episode 20, Klaus visits New Orleans when he hears there are plans brewing against him. New Orleans is also the primary setting of the spin-off series The Originals.
 The third season of American Horror Story, American Horror Story: Coven, is set in New Orleans.
 In What's New, Scooby-Doo?, the episode "Big Scare in the Big Easy" takes place in New Orleans, where two Civil War ghosts re-enact a duel every night to scare away guests.
 In The Looney Tunes Show, the New Orleans airport had a cameo in the episode "Spread Those Wings and Fly", when Daffy was working as a flight attendant.
 In Ben 10, the episode "Lucky Girl" takes place, where Ben, Gwen and their grandfather Max first meet the villainess magician Hex, and where Gwen adopts her superhero alias.
 In Monsters and Mysteries in America, New Orleans was featured in the first season's fifth episode where people claim to see vampires out and about.

Video games
Red Dead Redemption 2, the third installment of Red Dead series. The city of Saint Denis is based on 1889 New Orleans
Mafia 3, the third instalment of the Mafia titled crime games. The game takes place in New Bordeaux, which is a fictionalised version of New Orleans in the 1960s. 
The Adventures of Bayou Billy, a 1989 Crocodile Dundee imitation with a similar character from Louisiana; final stages take place on Bourbon Street
Assassin's Creed III: Liberation, takes place in 18th-century New Orleans
The Colonel's Bequest, a 1989 adventure game whose protagonist is a Tulane student in 1925
Gabriel Knight: Sins of the Fathers, a 1993 adventure game for PC, set in New Orleans
Hitman: Blood Money, contains the level "Murder of Crows," set in New Orleans
Infamous 2 takes place in New Marais, a fictional city taking inspirations from New Orleans
James Bond 007: Everything or Nothing, partly set in New Orleans
Left 4 Dead 2 takes place in the Deep South, with the last campaign (The Parish) taking place in New Orleans
Nancy Drew: Legend of the Crystal Skull, the 17th game in the Nancy Drew video game series, takes place in New Orleans
Sherlock Holmes: The Awakened contains investigations in New Orleans
Tony Hawk's Underground 2, skateboarding game, features New Orleans as one of its stages
Voodoo Vince, takes place in New Orleans
Gangster New Orleans, Android game. takes place in New Orleans.

See also

 New Orleans Square

References

 
 
 
Lists of television series by setting
Lists of films by setting
United States in fiction by city